MySQL Enterprise is a subscription-based service produced by Oracle Corporation and targeted toward the commercial market. Oracle's official support, training and certification focus on MySQL Enterprise.

MySQL Enterprise contains

 MySQL Enterprise Server software, a distribution of the MySQL Server
 MySQL Enterprise Monitor
 MySQL Enterprise Backup
 MySQL Enterprise Audit
 MySQL Enterprise Firewall
 MySQL Workbench Standard Edition
 Production Support

New versions of MySQL Enterprise Server are released monthly as Rapid Updates (MRUs), and quarterly as Service Packs (QSPs).

Relationship to free or community versions

MySQL Enterprise Edition was created by MySQL AB as a commercial product, available for purchase as a subscription.   It has been continued by Sun, and Oracle.

External links

 MySQL Enterprise Server

MySQL